Pseudosphex ichneumonea is a moth of the subfamily Arctiinae. It was described by Gottlieb August Wilhelm Herrich-Schäffer in 1854. It is found in Guatemala, Panama, Brazil and Argentina.

References

Pseudosphex
Moths described in 1854